The House of Chiefs in Fiji consists of the Fijian nobility, composed of about seventy chiefs of various ranks, majority of which are related. It is not a formal political body and is not the same as the former Great Council of Chiefs, which was a political body with a prescribed constitutional role, although the membership of the two bodies did overlap to a great extent.

The social hierarchy 

Fijian society is traditionally very stratified. A hierarchy of chiefs presides over villages (koro), sub-districts (tikina vou), districts (tikina cokavata), and provinces (yasana). These administrative divisions generally correspond roughly with the social units of the extended family (tokatoka), clan (mataqali), tribe (yavusa), and land (vanua). Each mataqali is presided over by a chief, styled Ratu if male or Adi (pronounced Ahn-di) if female. Chiefs presiding over units above the mataqali have other, more prestigious titles, although they, too, are typically addressed and referred to as Ratu or Adi, although there are regional variations. In Rewa, Ro is used instead of Ratu and Adi, while in the Lau Islands Roko is used. In Kadavu Group and in the west of Fiji, Bulou substitutes for Adi. The method of appointing chiefs is not uniform, although the position is generally held for life (with some exceptions) and there is a hereditary element, although the son of a chief does not automatically succeed to the position on his father's death. A chief may hold more than one title, just as a peer may in the United Kingdom; the late Ratu Sir Kamisese Mara, for example, was both Tui Nayau and Tui Lau.

Provinces and confederacies 

For administrative purposes, Fiji is divided into fourteen provinces, each of which has a Provincial Council in which the chiefs from the province are represented, along with commoners. Each Provincial Council is headed by a Roko Tui, whose appointment must be approved by the Fijian Affairs Board, a government department, which must also approve all bylaws passed and taxes levied by the Councils. (Titles can be deceptive: not every chief styled Roko Tui heads a Provincial Council). The Provincial Councils are significant in that they not only administer communally owned land (more than 80 percent of Fiji's total land area), but also elected most of the representatives to the Great Council of Chiefs. Moreover, the Great Council of Chiefs, which was charged with choosing 14 of the 32 members of the Fijian Senate, the upper house of the Parliament, normally delegated that task to the fourteen Provincial Councils.

All of the chiefs also belong to one of three confederacies: Kubuna, Burebasaga, and Tovata. For the most part, the boundaries of the confederacies correspond to the boundaries of the provinces. An anomaly exists in the west of the country, where the provinces of Ba and Ra are split between the confederacies of Kubuna and Burebasaga. This does not affect administration, however, as the confederacies and the provinces fulfill different roles, the former being based on the relationship of chiefs and clans, and the latter being formal political entities.

The highest chiefly title, the Tui Viti (King of Fiji), has been vacant since 1874, when King Seru Epenisa Cakobau and other prominent chiefs ceded the islands to the United Kingdom. But the Tui Viti title was relatively new; it was never a traditional kingly title of Fiji, but came into being after the death of Tanoa Visawaqa and the rise of his son Seru Epenisa Cakobau who proclaimed himself Tui Viti after conquering much of Fiji and persuading his fellow-chiefs to recognize him as their overlord.

However the title has been recognised since that time and the British monarch has filled a similar role since; even since Fiji became a republic in 1987, the former Great Council of Chiefs continued to recognise Queen Elizabeth II as its most senior chief, even though she ceased to be Queen of Fiji after Sitiveni Rabuka's two military coups in 1987, which overthrew the Dominion of Fiji and the 1970 Constitution of Fiji.

List of Fijian chiefly titles 
The following table depicts Fiji's districts, sub-districts, and villages, with their chiefs. Each chief, if known, is named in italics under his or her full formal title, which is in bold. The majority of chiefs rule over a group of villages (koro) belonging to a Tikina Vou (sub-district); some Tikina Vou are subdivided into two or more groupings of villages, each with its own chief. In a few cases, two groups of villages, or even two sub-districts, share a single chief. This is more common in Naitasiri Province than elsewhere. In the table, this is indicated by backgrounding in the same colour the areas shared by a chief. The Lau Islands are an anomaly: unlike the other provinces, their districts are not divided into sub-districts. All the 14 provinces have their own paramount chief with exceptions to Kadavu. Kadavu Province has nine chiefs; all are paramount in their own districts.

The districts, sub-districts, and villages are arranged, not alphabetically, but in the order of precedence of their chiefs. This order is not without controversy, but protocol generally observes it.

Ba 

Notes

Bua 

Notes

Cakaudrove 

Notes

Kadavu 

Notes

Lau 
{| table width="95%" border="1" align="center" cellpadding=3 cellspacing=0 style="margin:5px; border:3px solid;"
|valign="top" td width="15%" style="border-bottom:3px solid; background:#efefef;"|Tikina(District)||valign="top" td width="85%" style="border-bottom:3px solid; background:#efefef;"|Ai Cavuti (Chiefly Title)Ratu, Roko (Chief; named only if known)Koro (Villages)
|-
| rowspan=2 | Lakeba || Vuanirewa na Turaga na Tui NayauVacant 

| [[Naseuvou vua na Tui Nasaqalau]Nasaqalau

| Oneata || Bukatatanoa na Turaga na Tui Oneata Waiqori, Dakuiloa
|-
| Moce || Delaimakotu na Turaga na Ramasi Nasau, Korotolu
|-
| Vulaga || Vanuaseu na Turaga na Tui VulagaMuanaira, Muanaicake, Naividamu, Ogea
|-
| Ono || Naduruvesi, na Turaga na Tui OnoNukuni, Lovoni, Matokana, Doi, Vatoa
|-
| Kabara || Turaga na Tui KabaraNaikeleyaga, Tokalau, Lomaji, Udu, Namuka, Komo
|-
| Totoya || Lomanikoro na Turaga na Roko SauRoko Josefa DelainauluvatuTovu, Ketei, Dravuwalu, Udu, Vanuavatu
|-
| Moala || Nai Vucu ni Masi na Turaga na Tui Nasau/Yavusa Turagalevu na Turaga na Tui MoalaNaroi, Nasoki, Keteira, Vunuku, Cakova, Vadra, Maloku, Muaikacuni
|-
| Matuku || Burotukula na Turaga na Tui MatukuYaroi, Nakabati, Qalikarua, Levukaidaku, Makadru, Raviravi, Lomaji
|-
| Nayau || Vuanirewa na gone Turaga na Tui Nayau/Na Vaka i TuinayauSalia, Liku, Narocivo
|-
| rowspan=2 | Lomaloma || Turaga Na Ravunisa, Turaga na Rasau, Tui Naturuku, Tui MagoLomaloma, Susui, Narocivo, Namalata, Uruone, Levukana, Dakuiloma, Tuvuca
|-
| Rara Tabu vua na Turaga na Tui LauSawana (Yavusa Toga)
|-
| Mualevu || Turaga na Tui Mavana, na Sau kei MualevuMualevu, Mavana, Daliconi, Malaka, Muamua, Boitaci, Cikobia, Yavea
|-
| Cicia || Walakewa na Turaga na Tui CiciaTarukua, Natokalau, Lomaji, Mabula, Naceva
|}

Notes

 Lomaiviti 

Notes

 Macuata 

Notes

 Nadroga-Navosa 

Notes

 Naitasiri 

 Namosi 

 Ra 

Notes

 Rewa 

Notes

 Serua 

Notes

 Tailevu 
{| table width="95%" border="1" align="center" cellpadding=3 cellspacing=0 style="margin:5px; border:3px solid;"
|valign="top" td width="15%" style="border-bottom:3px solid; background:#efefef;"|Tikina Cokavata(District)||valign="top" td width="15%" style="border-bottom:3px solid; background:#efefef;"|Tikina Vou(Sub-District)||valign="top" td width="70%" style="border-bottom:3px solid; background:#efefef;"|Ai Cavuti (Chiefly Title)Ratu (Chief; named only if known)Koro (Villages)
|-
| rowspan=7 | Bau || rowspan=2 | Bau || Kubuna na Turaga Bale na Tui Kaba na VunivaluVacantBau, Soso, Lasakau, Namuka, Nakoroivau, Natila, Cautata, Dromuna, Ovea, Vatani, Vatoa, Waicoka
|-
| Natena na Roko Tui KiuvaKiuva, Muanaira, Naqeledamu, Logani, Natila
|-
| Nayaumunu vua na Turaga na Roko Tui ViwaViwa
|-
| Namara || Turaga na Roko Tui VeikauNaisausau, Nakorolevu, Matamaivere, Tubalevu, Naikawaga, Nakalawaca
|-
| Nausori || Na Turaga na RatuRatu Peni RokotuibauNausori, Vunimono, Nadali, Verata-Wailevu, Naduru, Molituva, Namono
|-
| Dravo || Navitomi na Turaga na TudrauDravo, Naisogovau, Naila, Mokani, Maumi
|-
| Namata || Nacobua na Turaga na Roko Tui NamataRatu Peni TagiveRaralevu, Namata
|-
| rowspan=4 | Nakelo || Nakelo || Rara o Nakelo na Turaga na Tui NakeloNauluvatu, Namuka-Vakali, Visama, Tumavia, Muana, Naluna, Vutuvo, Waikete, Naimalovau, Vaturua, Nasilai, Nakaulevu, Anitioki, Kelili, Nukulau, Vunivaivai, Vadrai
|-
| Nuku || Turaga na Tui Nabou Ratu Semi MatalauNatogadravu, Naselai, Natoveya
|-
| Tokatoka || Naceruku na Turaga na Tora DreketiRatu Apenisa TagivetauaNabitu, Vuci, Draubuta, Lomainasau, Vanuadina, Nakaile, Vanualevu
|-
| Buretu || Naibati na Turaga na Tora NaibatiRatu NailovolovoBuretu, Matainoco, Nabouciwa, Naivakacau, Daku
|-
| rowspan=5 | Verata || Verata || Na Bure Levu o Naisanokonoko, Nodra na Gone Turaga Bale, O Koya na RatuVacantUcunivanua, Naivuruvuru, Navunimono, Naloto, Sawa, Kumi, Naigani, Uluiloli|-
| Namalata || Waimarolevulevu na Turaga na RatuMatacaucau, Matacula, Nailega, Nakorovou, Veinuqa, Naitutu, Navunisole, Nakalawaca, Delasui, Nayawasara, Davetalevu
|-
| Tai || Turaga na Roko Tui TaiDravuni, Naisaumua
|-
| Vugalei || Vunisalevu na Turaga na Tui VugaleiNatobuniqio, Namulomulo, Nadaro, Sote, Visa, Savu, Naimasimasi, Naqeledamu, Logani, Naiborebore
|-
| Taivugalei || Burerua na Turaga na VunivaluNatuva, Nameka, Vatukarasa, Tonia
|-
| rowspan=3 | Sawakasa || Sawakasa || Nadereivalu na Turaga na RatuSawakasa I, Sawakasa II, Burerua, Dakuinuku, Lodoni, Vorovoro
|-
| Namena || Nawainovo na Tui WainovoNburenivalu, Nananu, Bureevu, Lawaki, Qoma, Qelekuro, Nabualau, Delaikuku, Nadrano
|-
| Dawasamu || Dawasamu na Turaga na RatuDriti, Delakado, Luvunavuaka, Nataleira, Silana, Nasinu, Nabualau, Delasui, Natadrave
|-
| rowspan=5 | Wainibuka || Naloto || Naloto na Turaga na Tui NalotoNaivicula, Naveicovatu, Nasau
|-
| Wailotua || Wailevu na Turaga na Tui WailevuWailotua II, Nalabe, Natokalau, Wailotua I
|-
| Nasautoka || Turaga Sau na VunivaluRatu Semi SeruvakulaNasautoka, Nabouva; Yavusa Nasautoka-Dakuivuna, Yavusa Nasautoka-Wailotua
|-
| Nayavu || Bau na Roko Tui BauNayavu, Naqia, Naseibitu, Namoka, Naveiveiwali, Natuvatuvavatu
|-
| Nailega || Naduadua na Turaga na VunivaluNaibita, Nailega, Wailevu, Nabulini, Manu
|}

Notes

 See also 

Malvatu Mauri (House of Chiefs) of Vanuatu

 References 

 Tui Viti and 1st Vunivalu of Kubuna Nakorotubu District 
 Bula Vakavanua''', by Semi B Seruvakula – 2000 – Ethnology (Fiji); Fijians (Social life and customs) reference to chart composition Fiji and the Fijians by Thomas Williams, James Calvert reference to Tui Viti title Chapter 2 Pages 33–34, also good reference for social structure and villages and titles The World of Talk on a Fijian Island: An Ethnography of Law and Communicative Causation – Page 64, by Andrew Arno – 1993, reference on social structures such as Yavusa, Matagali and Tokatoka along with other aspects''

External links 

 Ai Cavuti
 web article listing women Chiefs refer briefly to [./Http://www.guide2womenleaders.com/Fiji%20Heads.htm House of Chiefs] as some were members

 
Fijian culture
 
Lists of Fijian people
Society of Fiji
Fiji politics-related lists
Tribal chiefs